76th Division may refer to:

76th Airlift Division (United States)
76th Infantry Division (United Kingdom)
76th Infantry Division (United States)
76th Reserve Division (German Empire)
76th Infantry Division (Philippine Commonwealth Army)
76th Rifle Division (Soviet Union)

 Cavalry divisions  
 76th Cavalry Division (Philippine Commonwealth Army)

 Armoured divisions 
 76th Cavalry Division (Philippine Commonwealth Army)
 76th Tank Division (Soviet Union)

 Airborne divisions 
 76th Guards Air Assault Division (Russia), a unit of the Russian Army